Alfred Prospere is a Saint Lucian politician and retired Chief Forestry Officer. Prospere serves as the Minister for Agriculture, Fisheries, Food Security and Rural Development. He also represents the Dennery South constituency in the House of Assembly.

He was the endorsed Saint Lucia Labour Party candidate for the constituency of Dennery South. Prospere won the parliamentary elections by a slim margin of 184 votes over incumbent Edmund Estaphane,  polling 53.2% of the ballots cast, to secure victory for the Saint Lucia Labour Party in the 2021 Saint Lucian General Election.  The SLP secured a landslide victory over the United Workers Party.

References

External links 

 

Members of the House of Assembly of Saint Lucia
Saint Lucia Labour Party politicians
Living people
Government ministers of Saint Lucia
21st-century Saint Lucian politicians
Year of birth missing (living people)